Thio  is a commune in the South Province of New Caledonia, an overseas territory of France in the Pacific Ocean.

A novel Aerial tramway built by Adolf Bleichert & Co. company in 1906 existed here at the start of the 20th century to facilitate loading ore ships offshore.

References

https://archive.org/details/selectedbibliogr00amerrich 1916. pg 15 “about one thousand yards long”. Refers to Scientific American Supplement November 27, 1909 and Engineering & Mining Journal February 20, 1909 5 pages, illustrated.
http://www.zapgillou.fr/mondalazac/articleweb/partie2.htm has a postage stamp, a short description and a Google Earth view.

Communes of New Caledonia